Fjällbacka is a locality situated in Tanum Municipality, Västra Götaland County, Sweden with 859 inhabitants in 2010.

Fjällbacka is mostly known as a summer tourist resort, with a long history, and as the setting for many of best-selling Swedish noir writer Camilla Läckberg's novels.

Fjällbacka is located approximately 150 km from Gothenburg, 165 km from Oslo and 520 km from Stockholm.

Notable residents
The actress Ingrid Bergman lived here, when she visited Sweden.
Swedish crime writer Camilla Läckberg grew up here; many of her books take place in or around Fjällbacka.

References 

Populated places in Västra Götaland County
Populated places in Tanum Municipality